The Hudson's Site Development is an in-progress mixed-use development located in Downtown Detroit, Michigan, United States.

Site 

1208 Woodward Avenue is situated in Downtown Detroit, bounded by Grand River Avenue to the north, Farmer Street to the east, and Gratiot Avenue to the south. The entire block was once the home to Hudson's flagship store, which was built in phases between 1911 and 1946. It was the tallest department store in the world, at 440 ft, and the second largest department store by area in the world, behind Macy's Herald Square in New York City. In 1998, the building was imploded following 12 years of closure, making it the tallest building to ever be demolished by controlled implosion. In 2001, an underground parking garage was constructed at the site, with supports for a future structure to be built atop.

Design 
The buildings will be linked by a pedestrian bridge, as well as a 700-space underground parking garage.

History 
In 2013, after over a decade of little activity at the site, Rock Ventures announced that SHoP Architects had been selected to lead the design process for the area. In 2017, construction began with the removal of the underground parking garage that had been built in 2001. In March 2020, construction progress was halted due to the COVID-19 pandemic, but resumed after 45 days. In December of the same year, construction reached above the ground for the first time.

Gallery

References 

Skyscrapers in Detroit